Abraxas Lake is a lake with an intense blue color on the Ingrid Christensen Coast in East Antarctica. It is located in the Vestfold Hills. At least three different types of algae occur in this area, which is unusual for these latitudes.

The Antarctic Names Committee of Australia named the area on October 18, 1979.  Abraxas alludes to the magic emanating from this lake.

Literature 

 John Stewart: Antarctica – An Encyclopedia. Bd. 1, McFarland & Co., Jefferson and London 2011, P. 3

External links 

 Abraxas Lake in Composite Gazetteer of Antarctica
 About Abraxas Lake at cambridge.org

Ingrid Christensen Coast
Lakes of Princess Elizabeth Land
Wikipedia requested photographs in Antarctica